Hydrops is a genus of snakes in the subfamily Dipsadinae of the family Colubridae. The genus is endemic to South America.

Species
Three species are recognized as being valid.

Hydrops caesurus 
Hydrops martii  - Amazon water snake
Hydrops triangularis   - triangle water snake

Nota bene: A binomial authority in parentheses indicates that the species was originally described in a genus other than Hydrops.

Etymology
The specific name, martii, is in honor of German botanist Carl Friedrich Philipp von Martius.

References

Further reading
Boulenger GA (1894). Catalogue of the Snakes in the British Museum (Natural History). Volume II., Containing the Conclusion of the Colubridæ Aglyphæ. London: Trustees of the British Museum (Natural History). (Taylor and Francis, printers). xi + 382 pp. + Plates I-XX. (Genus Hydrops, pp. 186–187).
Freiberg M (1982). Snakes of South America. Hong Kong:T.F.H. Publications. 189 pp. . (Genus Hydrops, pp. 66, 72, 99-100).
Wagler J (1830). Natürliches System der AMPHIBIEN, mit vorangehender Classification der SÄUGTHIERE und VÖGEL. Ein Beitrag zur vergleichenden Zoologie. Munich, Stuttgart & Tübingen: J.G. Cotta. vi + 354 pp. + one plate. (Hydrops, new genus, p. 170). (in German and Latin).

Hydrops
Snake genera
Taxa named by Johann Georg Wagler